Air Vice Marshal Felton Vesey Holt,  (23 February 1886 – 23 April 1931) was a squadron and wing commander in the Royal Flying Corps who became a brigadier general in the newly established Royal Air Force (RAF) just before the end of the First World War. During the inter-war years Holt remained in the RAF, serving in several staff appointments before becoming Air Officer Commanding Fighting Area.

Holt was killed in a flying accident not long after taking up his final appointment. He was flying in a de Havilland DH.60M Moth from RAF Tangmere to take him back to RAF Uxbridge when it crashed at Seahurst Park near Chichester, following a collision with an Armstrong Whitworth Siskin. Holt managed to get out of the aircraft, but his parachute did not open in time.

 

|-
 

|-
 

1886 births
1931 deaths
Royal Air Force air marshals
Royal Air Force generals of World War I
Companions of the Order of St Michael and St George
Companions of the Distinguished Service Order
Graduates of the Royal Military College, Sandhurst
Royal Flying Corps officers
Oxfordshire and Buckinghamshire Light Infantry officers
Aviators killed in aviation accidents or incidents in England
People educated at Eton College
Military personnel from London
Victims of aviation accidents or incidents in 1931

References